Stoczki may refer to the following places:
Stoczki, Opoczno County in Łódź Voivodeship (central Poland)
Stoczki, Pajęczno County in Łódź Voivodeship (central Poland)
Stoczki, Podlaskie Voivodeship (north-east Poland)
Stoczki, Sieradz County in Łódź Voivodeship (central Poland)
Stoczki, Masovian Voivodeship (east-central Poland)